Ali Kılıç or Kilij Ali also known as Kılıç Ali Bey (born as Suleiman Asaf, 1890; Constantinople - July 14, 1971; Istanbul) was a Turkish officer of the Ottoman Army and Turkish Army. He was also a politician of the Republic of Turkey. He married with Füreya Koral, one of the first Turkish ceramicists. He was appointed a judge of the Independence Tribunal in the mid 1920s. Football coach Gündüz Kılıç was his son.

Medals and decorations 
Medal of Independence with Red-Green Ribbon

See also
List of recipients of the Medal of Independence with Red-Green Ribbon (Turkey)
Siege of Aintab

References

External links

1890 births
1971 deaths
Military personnel from Istanbul
Republican People's Party (Turkey) politicians
Deputies of Gaziantep
Ottoman Army officers
Turkish militia officers
Ottoman military personnel of World War I
Turkish military personnel of the Franco-Turkish War
Members of Kuva-yi Milliye
Recipients of the Medal of Independence with Red-Green Ribbon (Turkey)
Burials at Zincirlikuyu Cemetery